The 2010 New Brunswick general election was held on September 27, 2010, to elect 55 members to the 57th New Brunswick Legislative Assembly, the governing house of the province of New Brunswick, Canada. The incumbent Liberal government won 13 seats, while the opposition Progressive Conservatives won a landslide majority of 42 seats in the legislature.  As leader of the PC party, David Alward became New Brunswick's 32nd premier.

The Lieutenant-Governor of New Brunswick – acting on the advice of the Premier – would have originally been able to call an election earlier or as late as 2011; however a bill in the 56th Legislature has fixed election dates to the fourth Monday of September every four years beginning with this election.

With the defeat of Liberals, this election marked the first time in New Brunswick's history that a political party was voted out of office after just one term.

Timeline

2006
October 10, 2006 - Organizers for the Green Party of Canada in New Brunswick announce plans to form a provincial Green Party in time to field a full slate of candidates in this election.
November 5, 2006 - Allison Brewer resigns as leader of the New Democratic Party.  She will be replaced on an interim basis by Pat Hanratty and permanently upon the election of a new leader in late 2007.
December 12, 2006 - An opinion poll conducted November 10 to December 7 by Corporate Research Associates showed the Liberals enjoying an unprecedented lead in opinion polls, standing at 65% in contrast to 27% for the Progressive Conservatives, 6% for the New Democrats and 2% for the Greens.
December 13, 2006 - Bernard Lord resigns as leader of the Progressive Conservatives and announces he will resign his seat in the legislature on January 31, 2007.

2007
March 5, 2007 - Liberal Chris Collins wins Lord's former seat in Moncton East changing the standings in the legislature to 30 Liberals, 25 Progressive Conservatives.
April 17, 2007 - Progressive Conservatives Joan MacAlpine-Stiles and Wally Stiles cross the floor and join the Liberals changing the standings in the legislature to Liberals 32, Progressive Conservatives 23.
May 29, 2007 - Government House Leader Stuart Jamieson tables Bill 75 which would fix election dates to the fourth Monday of September every four years beginning on September 27 in 2010. 
October 13, 2007 - The NDP elect Roger Duguay as their new leader.

2008
 May 17, 2008 - The Green Party of New Brunswick is formed.  Mike Milligan is elected as the interim leader of the party until a convention can be held in the fall.
 November 3, 2008 - Progressive Conservative Jack Carr holds a seat previously held by fellow Progressive Conservative Keith Ashfield who was elected as Conservative MP for Fredericton restoring the standings in the legislature to 32 Liberals, 23 Progressive Conservatives.

2009
 March 9, 2009 - Liberal Burt Paulin wins a seat previously held by Progressive Conservative Percy Mockler changing the standings in the legislature to 33 Liberals, 22 Progressive Conservatives.
 December 25, 2009 - Premier Shawn Graham "says he's ready to fight the next election on his controversial plan to sell NB Power to Hydro-Québec."

2010
 January 4, 2010 - Justice Minister Michael Murphy unexpectedly resigns his seat to "spend more time with his family and return to practising law".
 February 5, 2010 - Cabinet Minister Stuart Jamieson is forced to leave his cabinet post for suggesting that the NB power deal be put to a referendum.
 March 24, 2010 - Premier Shawn Graham announces that the proposed sale of NB Power has been canceled.
 May 10, 2010 - Premier Shawn Graham shuffles the New Brunswick cabinet.  Bernard LeBlanc is reinstated as minister of justice, and also named the first minister responsible for public engagement. Brian Kenny is promoted to the tourism portfolio.  Cheryl Lavoie enters cabinet as minister of state for seniors. Donald Arseneault gains title of deputy premier.
 May 19, 2010 - Progressive Conservatives release Vision for Citizen Engagement and Responsible Government, a pre-campaign document that outlines the PC strategy to improve citizen engagement.
 June 9, 2010 - People's Alliance officially forms the newest N.B. political party under the leadership of former Tory Kris Austin.
 September 27, 2010 - David Alward is elected into office as Premier of New Brunswick.

Results

|- style="background:#ccc;"
!rowspan="2" colspan="2"|Party
!rowspan="2"|Party leader
!rowspan="2"|# ofcandidates
!colspan="4"|Seats
!colspan="3"|Popular vote
|- style="background:#ccc;"
| style="text-align:center;"|2006
| style="text-align:center;"|Dissolution
| style="text-align:center;"|Elected
| style="text-align:center;"|% Change
| style="text-align:center;"|#
| style="text-align:center;"|%
| style="text-align:center;"|Change

|align=left|Progressive Conservative
|align=left|David Alward
|align="right"|55
|align="right"|26
|align="right"|21
|align="right"|42
|align="right"|+16
|align="right"|181,397
|align="right"|48.80%
|align="right"|+1.30%

|align=left|Liberal
|align=left|Shawn Graham
|align="right"|55
|align="right"|29
|align="right"|32
|align="right"|13
|align="right"|-16
|align="right"|128,078
|align="right"|34.45%
|align="right"|-12.65%

|align=left|New Democratic
|align=left|Roger Duguay
|align="right"|55
|align="right"|0
|align="right"|0
|align="right"|0
|align="right"|
|align="right"|38,686
|align="right"|10.41%
|align="right"|+5.26%

|align=left|Jack MacDougall
|align="right"|49
|align="right"|*
|align="right"|0
|align="right"|0
|align="right"|
|align="right"|16,943
|align="right"|4.56%
|align="right"|*

|align=left|Kris Austin
|align="right"|14
|align="right"|*
|align="right"|0
|align="right"|0
|align="right"|
|align="right"|4,363
|align="right"|1.17%
|align="right"|*

| style="text-align:left;" colspan="2"|Independent
|align="right"|7
|align="right"|0
|align="right"|0
|align="right"|0
|align="right"| 
|align="right"|2,275
|align="right"|0.61%
|align="right"|+0.36%

| style="text-align:left;" colspan="2"|Vacant
|align="right"|
|align="right"|
|align="right"|2
|
|
|
|
|
|-
| style="text-align:left;" colspan="3"|Total
|align="right"|235
|align="right"|55
| style="text-align:right;"|55
| style="text-align:right;"|55
| style="text-align:right;"|-
| style="text-align:right;"|372,208
|colspan="2"|100%
|-
| style="text-align:left;" colspan="11"|Source: Provincial Election Results - Elections NB
|}

* Party did not run candidates in the last election

Results by region

Results by place

Target ridings
The following is a list of ridings which were narrowly lost by the indicated party.  For instance, under the Liberal column are the 10 seats in which they came closest to winning from the Conservatives, while under the Conservative column are the 10 seats in which they came closest to winning from the Liberals.  Listed is the name of the riding,  and the margin, in terms of percentage of the vote, by which the party lost.

These ridings are likely to be targeted by the specified party because the party lost them by a very slim margin in the 2006 election.

Up to 10 are shown, with a maximum margin of victory of 15%.  No party or independent candidate, other than the Liberals or Progressive Conservatives, came within 15% of winning any seats.

* Indicates incumbent not running again.

To clarify further; this is a list of provincial general election winners with their party in parentheses, and their margin as a percentage of the vote over the party whose list the seat is on (not the same as the margin of victory if the party potentially "targeting" the seat in that list did not finish second in the previous election). "Won" means that the targeting party won the seat from the incumbent party. "Held" means the incumbent party held the seat.

The ridings of Moncton East, Moncton West, Restigouche-La-Vallée and Petitcodiac are also likely to be targeted by the Conservatives as all have switched to the Liberals since the 2006 election.  Moncton East and Restigouche-La-Vallée were carried by the Liberals in by-elections while the MLAs for Moncton West and Petitcodiac crossed the floor from the PCs to the Liberals.

Opinion polls

Candidates

Retiring incumbents
The following sitting MLAs have announced that they will not seek re-election.
Tony Huntjens, Progressive Conservative MLA for Charlotte-Campobello since 2006, and previously MLA for Western Charlotte from 1999 to 2006.
Roly MacIntyre, Liberal MLA for Saint John East since 2006, and previously MLA for Saint John Champlain from 1995 to 1999 and 2003 to 2006.
Jeannot Volpé, Progressive Conservative MLA for Madawaska-les-Lacs since 1995.
Joan MacAlpine-Stiles, Liberal MLA (Originally Progressive Conservative) for Moncton West since 1999.
Stuart Jamieson, Liberal MLA for Saint John-Fundy, first elected from 1987 to 1999, and re-elected in 2003.
Eugene McGinley, Liberal MLA, first elected from 1972 to 1978 as MLA for Bathurst, and re-elected in 2003 as MLA for Grand Lake-Gagetown.
Cy LeBlanc, Progressive Conservative MLA elected in 1999 and re-elected in 2003 in the Dieppe-Memramcook riding.  He was re-elected again in 2006 in the Dieppe Centre-Lewisville riding.
 Mike Murphy, Liberal MLA, Moncton North. Serving, Minister of Justice, former Minister of Health.

Candidates by riding

Legend
bold denotes cabinet minister or party leader
italics denotes a potential candidate who has not received his/her party's nomination
† denotes an incumbent who is not running for re-election

Northeast 

|-
| style="background:whitesmoke;"|1. Campbellton-Restigouche Centre
|
|Roy Boudreau2,45334.42%
||
|Greg Davis3,91454.92%
|
|Widler Jules5247.35%
|
|Lynn Morrison Hemson2363.31%
|
|
||
|Roy Boudreau
|-
| style="background:whitesmoke;"|2. Dalhousie-Restigouche East
||
|Donald Arseneault3,63146.53%
|
|Joseph Elias2,59333.23%
|
|Ray Godin1,41318.11%
|
|Susan Smissaert1672.14%
|
|
||
|Donald Arseneault
|-
| style="background:whitesmoke;"|3. Nigadoo-Chaleur
||
|Roland Haché3,64949.77%
|
|Fred Albert2,79838.16%
|
|Serge Beaubrun7069.63%
|
|Mathieu LaPlante1792.44%
|
|
||
|Roland Haché
|-
| style="background:whitesmoke;"|4. Bathurst
||
|Brian Kenny2,89944.99%
|
|Nancy McKay2,82143.78%
|
|Sebastien Duke6209.62%
|
|Hazel Hachey1041.61%
|
|
||
|Brian Kenny
|-
| style="background:whitesmoke;"|5. Nepisiguit
|
|Cheryl Lavoie1,94632.49%
||
|Ryan Riordon2,45641.01%
|
|Pierre Cyr1,47624.65%
|
|Patrice Des Lauriers1111.85%
|
|
||
|Cheryl Lavoie
|-
| style="background:whitesmoke;"|6. Caraquet
||
|Hédard Albert3,663 - (50.07%)
|
|Philip Chiasson3,041 - (41.57%)
|
|Claudia Julien406 - (5.55%)
|
|Mathieu Chayer206 - (2.82%)
|
|
||
|Hédard Albert
|-
| style="background:whitesmoke;"|7. Lamèque-Shippagan-Miscou
|
|Alonzo Rail2,304 - (31.74%)
||
|Paul Robichaud4,272 - (58.84%)
|
|Armel Chiasson684 - (9.42%)
|
|
|
|
||
|Paul Robichaud
|-
| style="background:whitesmoke;"|8. Centre-Péninsule-Saint-Sauveur
||
|Denis Landry4,655 - (63.85%)
|
|Anike Robichaud1,487 - (20.40%)
|
|Francois Rousselle1,149 - (15.76%)
|
|
|
|
||
|Denis Landry
|-
| style="background:whitesmoke;"|9. Tracadie-Sheila
|
|Norma McGraw1,480 - (18.96%)
||
|Claude Landry3,808 - (48.78%)
|
|Roger Duguay2,518 - (32.26%)
|
|
|
|
||
|Claude Landry
|-
| style="background:whitesmoke;"|10. Miramichi Bay-Neguac
|
|Carmel Robichaud2,546 - (37.36%)
||
|Serge Robichaud2,908 - (42.67%)
|
|Marc-Alphonse Leclair1,132 - (16.61%)
|
|Filip Vanicek93 - (1.36%)
|
|Thomas L'Huillier (PANB)136 - (2.00%)
||
|Carmel Robichaud
|-
| style="background:whitesmoke;"|11. Miramichi-Bay du Vin
||
|Bill Fraser3,290 - (49.62%)
|
|Joan Cripps2,615 - (39.44%)
|
|Kelly Clancy-King510 - (7.69%)
|
|Ronald Mazerolle216 - (3.26%)
|
|
||
|Bill Fraser
|-
| style="background:whitesmoke;"|12. Miramichi Centre
|
|John Foran2,552 - (38.56%)
||
|Robert Trevors3,187 - (48.16%)
|
|Douglas Mullin379 - (5.73%)
|
|Dylan Schneider175 - (2.64%)
|
|Frances Connell (PANB)325 - (4.91%)
||
|John Foran
|-
| style="background:whitesmoke;"|13. Southwest Miramichi
|
|Rick Brewer1,952 - (30.17%)
||
|Jake Stewart3,792 - (58.60%)
|
|Jason Robar200 - (3.09%)
|
|Jimmy Lawlor204 - (3.15%)
|
|Wes Gullison (PANB)323 - (4.99%)
||
|Rick Brewer
|}

Southeast 

|-
| style="background:whitesmoke;"|14. Rogersville-Kouchibouguac
||
|Bertrand LeBlanc3,442 - (46.03%)
|
|Jimmy Bourque3,174 - (42.45%)
|
|Alida Fagan861 - (11.52%)
|
|
|
|
||
|vacant
|-
| style="background:whitesmoke;"|15. Kent
||
|Shawn Graham3,722 - (55.72%)
|
|Bruce Hickey1,720 - (25.75%)
|
|Susan Levi-Peters1,023 - (15.31%)
|
|Garry Sanipass215 - (3.22%)
|
|
||
|Shawn Graham
|-
| style="background:whitesmoke;"|16. Kent South
|
|Martin Goguen2,447 - (29.20%)
||
|Claude Williams5,055 - (60.33%)
|
|Oscar Doucet503 - (6.00%)
|
|Luc LeBreton374 - (4.46%)
|
|
||
|Claude Williams
|-
| style="background:whitesmoke;"|17. Shediac-Cap-Pelé
||
|Victor Boudreau5,244 - (61.33%)
|
|Janice Brun2,121 - (24.81%)
|
|Yves Leger669 - (7.82%)
|
|Natalie Arsenault409 - (4.78%)
|
|Charles Vautour (Ind.)107 - (1.25%)
||
|Victor Boudreau
|-
| style="background:whitesmoke;"|18. Tantramar
|
|Beth Barczyk911 - (19.02%)
||
|Mike Olscamp2,712 - (56.62%)
|
|Bill Evans513 - (10.71%)
|
|Margaret Tusz-King654 - (13.65%)
|
|
||
|Mike Olscamp
|-
| style="background:whitesmoke;"|19. Memramcook-Lakeville-Dieppe
||
|Bernard LeBlanc3,426 - (50.82%)
|
|Fortunat Duguay2,174 - (32.25%)
|
|Denis Brun707 - (10.49%)
|
|Fanny Leblanc435 - (6.45%)
|
|
||
|Bernard LeBlanc
|-
| style="background:whitesmoke;"|20. Dieppe Centre-Lewisville
||
|Roger Melanson4,541 - (46.24%)
|
|Dave Maltais3,429 - (34.91%)
|
|Agathe Lapointe1,174 - (11.95%)
|
|Paul LeBreton677 - (6.89%)
|
|
||
|Cy LeBlanc†
|-
| style="background:whitesmoke;"|21. Moncton East
||
|Chris Collins2,694 - (41.54%)
|
|Karen Nelson2,528 - (38.98%)
|
|Teresa Sullivan626 - (9.65%)
|
|Roy MacMullin637 - (9.82%)
|
|
||
|Chris Collins
|-
| style="background:whitesmoke;"|22. Moncton West
|
|Anne Marie Picone Ford1,995 - (32.50%)
||
|Susan Stultz2,983 - (48.59%)
|
|Shawna Gagne580 - (9.45%)
|
|Carrie Sullivan503 - (8.19%)
|
|Barry Renouf (Ind.)78 - (1.27%)
||
|Joan MacAlpine-Stiles†
|-
| style="background:whitesmoke;"|23. Moncton North
|
|Kevin Robart1,912 - (36.54%)
||
|Marie-Claude Blais2,349 - (44.90%)
|
|Jean Guimond512 - (9.79%)
|
|Greta Doucet367 - (7.01%)
|
|Carl Bainbridge (PANB)92 - (1.76%)
||
|vacant
|-
| style="background:whitesmoke;"|24. Moncton Crescent
|
|Russ Mallard2,538 - (30.77%)
||
|John Betts4,171 - (50.57%)
|
|Cyprien Okana809 - (9.81%)
|
|Mike Milligan730 - (8.85%)
|
|
||
|John Betts
|-
| style="background:whitesmoke;"|25. Petitcodiac
|
|Wally Stiles1,769 - (23.84%)
||
|Sherry Wilson4,135 - (55.74%)
|
|Leta Both666 - (8.98%)
|
|Bethany Thorne-Dykstra849 - (11.44%)
|
|
||
|Wally Stiles
|-
| style="background:whitesmoke;"|26. Riverview
|
|Lana Hansen1,626 - (23.47%)
||
|Bruce Fitch4,357 - (62.89%)
|
|Darryl Pitre457 - (6.60%)
|
|Steven Steeves488 - (7.04%)
|
|
||
|Bruce Fitch
|-
| style="background:whitesmoke;"|27. Albert
|
|Claude Curwin1,252 - (19.54%)
||
|Wayne Steeves4,009 - (62.57%)
|
|Anthony Crandall412 - (6.43%)
|
|Vernon Woolsey448 - (6.99%)
|
|Lucy Rolfe (PANB)286 - (4.46%)
||
|Wayne Steeves
|}
 - Collins won the seat in a by-election on March 5, 2007.  The seat was previously held by Progressive Conservative former premier Bernard Lord.

 - MacAlpine-Stiles crossed the floor to the Liberals on April 17, 2007.  She previously sat as a Progressive Conservative.

 - Stiles crossed the floor to the Liberals on April 17, 2007.  He previously sat as a Progressive Conservative.

Southwest 

|-
| style="background:whitesmoke;"|28. Kings East
|
|George Horton1,418 - (21.14%)
||
|Bruce Northrup4,476 - (66.73%)
|
|Robert Murray487 - (7.26%)
|
|Jenna Milligan327 - (4.87%)
|
|
||
|Bruce Northrup
|-
| style="background:whitesmoke;"|29. Hampton-Kings
|
|Kit Hickey1,668 - (22.28%)
||
|Bev Harrison4,302 - (57.47%)
|
|Julie Drummond1,193 - (15.93%)
|
|Pierre Roy323 - (4.31%)
|
|
||
|Bev Harrison
|-
| style="background:whitesmoke;"|30. Quispamsis
|
|Mary Schryer2,752 - (34.24%)
||
|Blaine Higgs4,075 - (50.70%)
|
|Matt Doherty911 - (11.33%)
|
|Mark Woolsey300 - (3.73%)
|
|
||
|Mary Schryer
|-
| style="background:whitesmoke;"|31. Saint John-Fundy
|
|Gary Keating1,736 - (30.98%)
||
|Glen Savoie2,913 - (51.99%)
|
|Lise Lennon594 - (10.60%)
|
|Matthew Clark187 - (3.34%)
|
|Glenn McAllister (PANB)173 - (3.09%)
||
|Stuart Jamieson†
|-
| style="background:whitesmoke;"|32. Rothesay
|
|Victoria Clarke1,694 - (28.40%)
||
|Margaret-Ann Blaney3,374 - (56.57%)
|
|Pamela Scichilone535 - (8.97%)
|
|Sharon Murphy-Flatt361 - (6.05%)
|
|
||
|Margaret-Ann Blaney
|-
| style="background:whitesmoke;"|33. Saint John East
|
|Kevin McCarville1,867 - (33.06%)
||
|Glen Tait2,137 - (37.84%)
|
|Sandy Harding 1,338 - (23.69%)
|
|Ann McAllister305 - (5.40%) 
|
|
||
|Roly MacIntyre†
|-
| style="background:whitesmoke;"|34. Saint John Harbour
|
|Ed Doherty1,326 - (30.45%)
||
|Carl Killen1,333 - (30.66%)
|
|Wayne Dryer1,203 - (27.63%)
|
|Patty Higgins236 - (5.45%)
|
|John Campbell (Ind.)247 - (5.81%)
||
|Ed Doherty
|-
| style="background:whitesmoke;"|35. Saint John Portland
|
|Dan Joyce2,062 - (35.31%)
||
|Trevor Holder2,926 - (50.10%)
|
|Jeremy Higgins576 - (9.86%)
|
|Stefan Warner192 - (3.29%)
|
|Lisa Cromwell (PANB)84 - (1.44%)
||
|Trevor Holder
|-
| style="background:whitesmoke;"|36. Saint John Lancaster
|
|Abel LeBlanc2,287 - (33.81%)
||
|Dorothy Shephard3,433 - (50.75%)
|
|Habib Kilisli688 - (10.17%)
|
|Mary Ellen Carpenter247 - (3.65%)
|
|Wendy Coughlin (PANB)110 - (1.63%)
||
|Abel LeBlanc
|-
| style="background:whitesmoke;"|37. Fundy-River Valley
|
|Jack Keir1,815 - (28.74%)
||
|Jim Parrott3,633 - (57.53%)
|
|David Sullivan427 - (6.76%)
|
|Stephanie Coburn222 - (3.52%)
|
|Edward Hoyt (PANB)218 - (3.45%)
||
|Jack Keir
|-
| style="background:whitesmoke;"|38. Charlotte-The Isles
||
|Rick Doucet3,176 - (51.27%)
|
|Sharon Tucker2,286 - (36.90%)
|
|Sharon Greenlaw305 - (4.92%)
|
|Burt Folkins180 - (2.91%)
|
|Theresa James (PANB)248 - (4.00%)
||
|Rick Doucet
|-
| style="background:whitesmoke;"|39. Charlotte-Campobello
|
|Annabelle Juneau1,516 - (24.46%)
||
|Curtis Malloch2,980 - (48.08%)
|
|Lloyd Groom798 - (12.88%)
|
|Janice Harvey500 - (8.07%)
|
|John Craig (PANB)404 - (6.52%)
||
|Tony Huntjens†
|}

Central 

|-
| style="background:whitesmoke;"|40. Oromocto
|
|Georgina Jones569 - (12.62%)
||
|Jody Carr3,662 - (81.23%)
|
|Beau Davidson277 - (6.14%)
|
|
|
|
||
|Jody Carr
|-
| style="background:whitesmoke;"|41. Grand Lake-Gagetown
|
|Barry Armstrong2,108 - (29.16%)
||
|Ross Wetmore3,290 - (45.51%)
|
|J.R. Magee237 - (3.28%)
|
|Sandra Burtt175 - (2.42%)
|
|Kris Austin (PANB)1,419 - (19.63%)
||
|Eugene McGinley†
|-
| style="background:whitesmoke;"|42. Fredericton-Nashwaaksis
|
|T.J. Burke2,712 - (35.28%)
||
|Troy Lifford3,656 - (47.56%)
|
|Dana Brown592 - (7.70%)
|
|Jack MacDougall727 - (9.46%)
|
|
||
|T.J. Burke
|-
| style="background:whitesmoke;"|43. Fredericton-Fort Nashwaak
|
|Kelly Lamrock2,586 - (34.16%)
||
|Pam Lynch3,571 - (47.17%)
|
|Andy Scott861 - (11.37%)
|
|Kathleen MacDougall553 - (7.30%)
|
|
||
|Kelly Lamrock
|-
| style="background:whitesmoke;"|44. Fredericton-Lincoln 
|
|Greg Byrne2,178 - (35.31%)
||
|Craig Leonard2,437 - (39.51%)
|
|Jason Purdy945 - (15.32%)
|
|Tracey Waite608 - (9.86%)
|
|
||
|Greg Byrne
|-
| style="background:whitesmoke;"|45. Fredericton-Silverwood
|
|Rick Miles2,469 - (32.53%)
||
|Brian Macdonald2,931 - (38.62%)
|
|Tony Myatt1,220 - (16.07%)
|
|Jim Wolstenholme903 - (11.90%)
|
|Jim Andrews (Ind.)67 - (0.88%)
||
|Rick Miles
|-
| style="background:whitesmoke;"|46. New Maryland-Sunbury West
|
|Larry DeLong1,502 - (23.33%)
||
|Jack Carr4,097 - (63.65%)
|
|Jesse Travis547 - (8.50%)
|
|Ellen Comer291 - (4.52%)
|
|
||
|Jack Carr
|-
| style="background:whitesmoke;"|47. York
|
|Winston Gamblin1,486 - (22.95%)
||
|Carl Urquhart3,614 - (55.82%)
|
|Sharon Scott-Levesque1,012 - (15.63%)
|
|Jean Louis Deveau362 - (5.59%)
|
|
||
|Carl Urquhart
|-
| style="background:whitesmoke;"|48. York North
|
|Eugene Price1,232 - (17.39%)
||
|Kirk MacDonald4,486 - (63.33%)
|
|Genevieve MacRae675 - (9.53%)
|
|Jarrod Currie305 - (4.31%)
|
|Steven Hawkes (PANB)386 - (5.45%)
||
|Kirk MacDonald
|}

 - Carr won the seat in a by-election on November 3, 2008.  The seat was previously held by fellow Progressive Conservative Keith Ashfield.

Northwest 

|-
| style="background:whitesmoke;"|49. Woodstock
|
|Jeff Bradbury710 - (10.22%)
||
|David Alward4,673 - (67.27%)
|
|Conrad Anderson280 - (4.03%)
|
|Todd Antworth103 - (1.48%)
|
|Dale Allen (Ind.)996 - (14.34%)David Kennedy (PANB)185 - (2.66%)
||
|David Alward
|-
| style="background:whitesmoke;"|50. Carleton
|
|Peter Cook1,711 - (27.17%)
||
|Dale Graham3,884 - (61.67%)
|
|Jacob Elsinga319 - (5.07%)
|
|Tegan Wong-Daugherty384 - (6.10%)
|
|
||
|Dale Graham
|-
| style="background:whitesmoke;"|51. Victoria-Tobique
|
|Larry Kennedy2,039 - (40.05%)
||
|Wes McLean2,684 - (52.72%)
|
|David Burns109 - (2.14%)
|
|Wayne Sabine118 - (2.32%)
|
|Carter Edgar (Ind.)141 - (2.77%)
||
|Larry Kennedy
|-
| style="background:whitesmoke;"|52. Grand Falls-Drummond-Saint-André
|
|Ron Ouellette2,715 - (43.60%)
||
|Danny Soucy3,058 - (49.11%)
|
|Maureen Michaud292 - (4.69%)
|
|Cécile Martel Robitaille162 - (2.60%)
|
|
||
|Ron Ouellette
|-
| style="background:whitesmoke;"|53. Restigouche-La-Vallée
|
|Burt Paulin2,492 - (35.72%)
||
|Martine Coulombe3,727 - (53.43%)
|
|Alain Martel551 - (7.90%)
|
|André Arpin206 - (2.95%)
|
|
||
|Burt Paulin
|-
| style="background:whitesmoke;"|54. Edmundston-Saint-Basile
|
|Michelle Daigle1,362 - (18.60%)
||
|Madeleine Dubé5,551 - (75.81%)
|
|Michel Thebeau226 - (3.09%)
|
|Michelle Simard183 - (2.50%)
|
|
||
|Madeleine Dubé
|-
| style="background:whitesmoke;"|55. Madawaska-les-Lacs
|
|Jocelyn Lévesque1,989 - (31.85%)
||
|Yvon Bonenfant3,380 - (54.13%)
|
|Nicole Theriault230 - (3.68%)
|
|
|
|Jean-Marc Nadeau (Ind.)645 - (10.33%)
||
|Jeannot Volpé†
|}

 - Paulin won the seat in a by-election on March 9, 2009.  The seat was previously held by Progressive Conservative Percy Mockler.

References

External links 
 Election New Brunswick 2010
 Election New Brunswick 2010, Unofficial Candidate List
 Election Almanac - New Brunswick Provincial Election 2010

Elections in New Brunswick
2010 elections in Canada
2010 in New Brunswick
September 2010 events in Canada